Crystal Johnson is an attorney from South Dakota serving as State's Attorney for Minnehaha County, the state's most populous county, of which the county seat is Sioux Falls.

Early life and education
Johnson was born in Viborg, South Dakota. She received a B.A. from the University of Sioux Falls in 1999 and a J.D. from the University of Kansas School of Law in 2002.

Career
In 2005, Johnson joined the Minnehaha State's Attorney's Office. In 2014, she was named South Dakota Prosecutor of the Year. In 2015, the South Dakota Supreme Court appointed Johnson to the Second Judicial Circuit to replace Judge Joni Cutler. During her time on the bench, Johnson was a member of the Minnehaha County Veteran's Treatment Court and served on pre-trial detention and release committees. In May 2018, she left the judiciary and returned to the Minnehaha State's Attorney's Office.

In 2019, the presiding judge of the Second Circuit Court, Robin Houwman, appointed Johnson the interim Minnehaha County State's Attorney after Aaron McGowan resigned. In January 2020, the Minnehaha County Commission approved Johnson's appointment.

Johnson is also a part-time adjunct professor of political science at the University of South Dakota.

References

External links
 Minnehaha States Attorney's Office

1977 births
Living people
South Dakota Republicans
University of Sioux Falls alumni
University of Kansas alumni
South Dakota lawyers
21st-century American politicians
21st-century American women politicians
21st-century American lawyers
21st-century American women lawyers